Whitley David Merrifield (born January 24, 1989) is an American professional baseball second baseman and outfielder for the Toronto Blue Jays of Major League Baseball (MLB). He has previously played in MLB for the Kansas City Royals. He is a two-time All-Star and has led the American League in stolen bases three times.

Amateur career
Merrifield graduated from Davie County High School in Mocksville, North Carolina. He enrolled at the University of South Carolina and played college baseball for the South Carolina Gamecocks from 2008 to 2010. In 2008, he played collegiate summer baseball for the Yarmouth–Dennis Red Sox of the Cape Cod Baseball League, and in 2009 returned to the league to play with the Chatham Anglers. In the second game of the championship series at the 2010 College World Series, Merrifield hit a game-winning RBI single in the bottom of the 11th inning to give South Carolina the championship. In his three years at South Carolina, he played in 195 games and hit .329/.389/.489 with 27 home runs.

Professional career

Kansas City Royals
Merrifield was drafted by the Kansas City Royals in the ninth round of the 2010 Major League Baseball draft. He signed with the Royals and made his professional debut that season with the Burlington Bees. In 47 games he hit .253/.317/.409 with five home runs and 26 RBIs. In 2011, Merrifield played for the Wilmington Blue Rocks where he batted .262 with five home runs and 36 RBIS. In 2012, with both Wilmington and the Northwest Arkansas Naturals, he compiled a .258 batting average with nine home runs and 44 RBIs in 125 games between both teams. He spent 2013 with Northwest Arkansas where he batted .270/.319/.391 with three home runs and 43 RBIs in 94 games.

Merrifield returned to Northwest Arkansas to start 2014 and was promoted to the Omaha Storm Chasers during the season. In 120 games between the two clubs, he slashed .319/.371/.470 with eight home runs and 49 RBIs. In 2015, Merrifield played for Omaha where he posted a .265 batting average with five home runs and 38 RBIs in 135 games. He returned to Omaha to start the 2016 season.

Merrifield made his major league debut with the Kansas City Royals on May 18, 2016, instantly batting in the top third of the lineup and soon taking the starting second baseman job from Omar Infante. His first Major League hit came off of David Price.

On June 13, 2016, Whit hit both his first major league triple and home run against the Cleveland Indians. In early July 2016, a song and video tribute to Merrifield titled, "Cool Whit" went viral on YouTube and Facebook, receiving coverage on local Kansas City radio and TV news. "Cool Whit" T-shirts were also circulating amongst Royals fans. He was optioned back to Omaha in July and recalled in September. In 69 games for Omaha he batted .266 with eight home runs and 29 RBIs, and in 81 games for Kansas City he compiled a .283 batting average with two home runs, 29 RBIs, and 22 doubles.

Merrifield began the 2017 season with Omaha, but was recalled in April after nine games and spent the remainder of the season with Kansas City. With the Royals, he hit .288  in 145 games with 19 home runs and 78 RBIs. He also led the American League with 34 stolen bases, the fewest total for a league leader since Luis Aparicio led the AL with 31 in 1962.

In 2018, Merrifield hit .304/.367/.438 and led the majors in hits (192) and stolen bases (45).

In 2019, he batted .302/.348/.463 and led the major leagues in games (162), at bats (681), singles (139), triples (10), and line drive percentage (28.2%), while stealing 20 bases and leading the majors in caught stealing (10).

Overall with the 2020 Kansas City Royals, Merrifield batted .282 with nine home runs and 30 RBIs in 60 games.

In 2021, Merrifield hit .277/.317/.395 with 10 home runs and 74 RBIs. He tied for the MLB lead with 42 doubles, and led the American League with 40 steals. He also tied for the major league lead in sacrifice flies, with 12. On defense, he led all major league second basemen with 283  putouts, 103 double plays and a 4.77 range factor. He won a Fielding Bible Award for his defensive excellence. Merrifield played in a franchise-record 553 consecutive games for the Royals between June 2018 and July 2022.

Toronto Blue Jays
On August 2, 2022, Merrifield was traded to the Toronto Blue Jays for Max Castillo and Samad Taylor. He was among ten Royals players who were in violation of Canada's COVID-19 vaccination requirement and unable to travel to Toronto for a four-game weekend series right before the All-Star break two weeks earlier in July. On August 4, 2022, Merrifield announced that he was now vaccinated and would be able to play in the team's first game in Toronto since being acquired.

In 2022 he batted .250/.298/.375 in 550 plate appearances, and was the only qualified batter in the major leagues who was not hit by a pitch all year.

International career
On September 10, 2018, he was selected by the MLB All-Stars at 2018 MLB Japan All-Star Series.

Personal life
Merrifield is a Christian. Merrifield married his wife Jordan Michael on December 28, 2019.

Merrifield's father, Bill, played college baseball for Wake Forest University, and spent six seasons in Minor League Baseball, primarily as a third baseman. In September 1987, Bill Merrifield was briefly on the active roster of the Pittsburgh Pirates, but was sent to the Florida Instructional League without making an MLB appearance, rendering him a "phantom ballplayer".

See also

 List of Major League Baseball annual doubles leaders
 List of Major League Baseball annual triples leaders
 List of University of South Carolina people
 Major League Baseball consecutive games played streaks

References

External links

South Carolina Gamecocks bio
 
 

1989 births
Living people
American League All-Stars
American League stolen base champions
Baseball players from North Carolina
Burlington Bees players
Chatham Anglers players
Kansas City Royals players
Major League Baseball second basemen
Major League Baseball left fielders
Northwest Arkansas Naturals players
Omaha Storm Chasers players
People from Florence, South Carolina
People from Mocksville, North Carolina
South Carolina Gamecocks baseball players
Surprise Saguaros players
Toronto Blue Jays players
Wilmington Blue Rocks players
Yarmouth–Dennis Red Sox players